The Raid on Oyster River (also known as the Oyster River Massacre) happened during King William's War, on July 18, 1694, at present-day Durham, New Hampshire.

Historical context 
Massachusetts responded to the Siege of Pemaquid (1689) by sending out 600 men to the border region. Led by Major Jeremiah Swaine of Reading, Massachusetts, the soldiers met on August 28, 1689, and then scoured the region. Despite Swaine's presence, the natives attacked Oyster River (Durham, New Hampshire) and killed 21 people, taking several others captive. In 1693, the English at Boston had entered into peace and trade negotiations with the Abenaki tribes in eastern Massachusetts. The French at Quebec under Governor Frontenac wished to disrupt the negotiations and sent Claude-Sébastien de Villieu in the fall of 1693 into present-day Maine, with orders to "place himself at the head of the Acadian Indians and lead them against the English." Villieu spent the winter at Fort Nashwaak. The Indian bands of the region were in general disagreement whether to attack the English or not, but after discussions by Villieu and the support of Father Louis-Pierre Thury and Father Vincent Bigot (at Pentagouet) they went on the offensive.

Raid 
The English settlement of Oyster River was attacked by Villieu with about 250 Abenaki Indians, composed of two main groups from the Penobscot and Norridgewock under command of their sagamore Bomazeen (or Bomoseen). A number of Maliseet from Medoctec took part in the attack. The Indian force was divided into two groups to attack the settlement, which was laid out on both sides of the Oyster River. Villieu led the Pentagoet and the Meductic/Nashwaaks. The attack commenced at daybreak, with the small forts quickly falling to the attackers. In all, 104 inhabitants were killed and 27 taken captive, with half the dwellings, including the garrisons, pillaged and burned to the ground. Crops were destroyed and livestock killed, causing famine and destitution for survivors.

Consequences 
After the successful raid on Oyster River, Claude-Sébastien de Villieu joined Acadian Governor Joseph Robineau de Villebon as the commander of Fort Nashwaak, capital of Acadia.

See also 
Military history of the Maliseet people

References
Endnotes

Primary texts
  William L. Wolkovich - Valkavicius, "The Groton Indian Raid of 1694 and Lydia Longley", Historical Journal of Massachusetts Volume 30, No. 2 (Summer 2002)
 Acadia at the end of the 17th Century, p. 56
 A French account of the raid upon the New England frontier in 1694. Acadiensis. 1901
 Rev. John Pike, Journal of the Rev. John Pike, of Dover, N.H., ed. Rev. A.H. Quint (Cambridge: Press of John Wilson and Son, 1876)
 Jan K. Herman, "Massacre at Oyster River," New Hampshire Profiles, October 1976, 50.
 Francis Parkman, Count Frontenac and New France under Louis XIV, vol. 2 of France and England in North America (1877; reprint, New York: The Library of America, 1983)
 Jeremy Belknap, The History of New Hampshire, ed. John Farmer (Dover, N.H.: S.C. Stevens and Ela & Wadleigh, 1831)
 Thomas Hutchinson, The History of the Colony and Province of Massachusetts Bay (originally published 1764–1828; reprint, Cambridge: Harvard University Press, 1936), 2:55.
 Cotton Mather, Decennium Luctuosum (Boston, 1699); reprinted in Magnalia Christi Americana (London, 1702), 86.
 Everett S. Stackpole, History of New Hampshire (New York: The American Historical Society, 1926), 1:182.
  Samuel Adams Drake, The Border Wars of New England Commonly called King William's and Queen Anne's Wars (Williamstown, Mass: Corner House, 1973), 96.
 Jan K. Herman, "Massacre on the Northern New England Frontier, 1689–1694" (master's thesis, University of New Hampshire, 1966), 43.
 Kenneth M. Morrison, The Embattled Northeast (Berkeley: University of California Press, 1984), 128.
 John Clarence Webster, Acadia at the End of the Seventeenth Century. Saint John, NB, The New Brunswick Museum, 1979.
 The address of C. Alice Baker - History and Proceedings of the Pocumtuck Valley Memorial Association, Volume 4, p. 401
 Samuel Abbott Green, "Groton during the Indian Wars"; see: "King Williams War"

External links 
Raid on Oyster River

Military history of Acadia
Military history of Nova Scotia
Military history of New England
Military history of Canada
King William's War
Battles involving England
Battles involving France
Captives of Native Americans
Conflicts in 1694
17th century in Canada
New France
Military raids
1694 in the Thirteen Colonies
Province of New Hampshire